National Road 82 (abbreviated as EO82) is a single carriageway road in southern Greece. It connects Pylos with Sparti via Kalamata. It passes through the regional units Messenia and Laconia, on the Peloponnese peninsula. Its length is 110 km.

Route
The western end of the GR-82 is in the port town Pylos, on the Ionian Sea, where it is connected with the Greek National Road 9. It runs to the east through low hills, passing north of the Lykodimo mountain. It reaches the Messenian Gulf near Velika, and continues near the north shore of the gulf. It passes along Messini and through the city Kalamata, where it is connected with the Greek National Road 7. It leaves Kalamata towards the northeast, and crosses the Taygetus mountains over a pass of about 1300 m elevation. It descends to the city of Sparti, its eastern terminus. Here it is connected with the Greek National Road 39.

National Road 82 passes through the following places:

Pylos
Chandrinos 
Neromylos
Velika
Messini
Asprochoma
Kalamata
Artemisia
Trypi
Magoula
Sparti

82
Roads in Peloponnese (region)